Carlos Koyana (born 19 January 1993) is a South African cricketer. He made his first-class debut for Western Province in the 2016–17 Sunfoil 3-Day Cup on 6 October 2016. He made his Twenty20 debut for Western Province in the 2017 Africa T20 Cup on 25 August 2017.

In September 2018, he was named in Western Province's squad for the 2018 Africa T20 Cup.

References

External links
 

1993 births
Living people
South African cricketers
Western Province cricketers
Place of birth missing (living people)